Eric Mackenzie (born 19 May 1988) is a former Australian rules footballer who played for the West Coast Eagles in the Australian Football League (AFL).

Career

West Coast Eagles 
Mackenzie was drafted in the 2nd round of the 2006 AFL Draft.

A key position defender, he had his best season to date in 2014.  He replaced the retiring Darren Glass as the club's leading backman and was named acting co-captain of the club for the remainder of the season, along with four other players.  He ended the year by winning the Eagles' best and fairest award, the John Worsfold Medal, beating Brownlow Medallist Matt Priddis by 11 votes.

He missed the entire 2015 AFL season after tearing his anterior cruciate ligament in West Coast's first pre-season game of the year against Carlton.

In the final minutes of 2017 Elimination Final played against Port Adelaide Power, with scores level, Mackenzie kept Port Adelaide from scoring a behind, throwing the full force of his body into the point post in the process. This helped force the Elimination Final into extra time, where the Eagles emerged victorious.

Mackenzie retired at the end of the 2018 season, after consistent troubles with injury.

References

External links

Living people
1988 births
Claremont Football Club players
People educated at Christ Church Grammar School
Sportsmen from Western Australia
West Coast Eagles players
John Worsfold Medal winners
Australian rules footballers from Perth, Western Australia
East Perth Football Club players